Sebezhsky District is an administrative and municipal district (raion), one of the twenty-four in Pskov Oblast, Russia. It is located in the southwest of the oblast and borders with Rasony and Verkhnyadzvinsk Districts of Vitebsk Oblast of Belarus in the south, Zilupe, Ludza, and Cibla municipalities of Latvia in the west, Krasnogorodsky and Opochetsky Districts in the north, and with Pustoshkinsky and Nevelsky Districts in the east. Its administrative center is the town of Sebezh. Population:  25,473 (2002 Census);  The population of Sebezh accounts for 29.4% of the district's total population.

Geography
A major part of the district lies in the basin of the Velikaya River. The Velikaya itself crosses the northeastern part of the district. The biggest tributary of the Velikaya within the district is the Issa (left). Rivers in some areas in the south of the district drain into Belarus and into the Daugava River.

The landscape of the district is a hilly plain of glacial origin. There are many lakes all over the district. The biggest ones include Lakes Sebezhskoye, Orono (both in the immediate vicinity of the town of Sebezh), Necheritsa, and Sviblo. To protect the lakes and the surrounding landscape, Sebezhsky National Park was established in the southwest of the district. This is the only national park in Pskov Oblast.

Sand, clay, and peat are all being produced in the district.

History
Sebezh was first mentioned in 1414. It was described as a fortress protecting Pskov from the south, and it was conquered by Polish troops. It is not clear whether the fortress was identical to the currently existing Sebezh, since it was also mentioned that a fortress was founded by Russians in 1535 at the present location of the town. Subsequently, the area was borderline between Russia and Grand Duchy of Lithuania, and changed hands several times. In the 18th century, it belonged to Poland until 1772, when during the First Partition of Poland the area was transferred to the Russian Empire. To accommodate the transferred areas, Pskov Governorate was established in 1772. In 1773, Sebezh was chartered and became the seat of Sebezhsky Uyezd of Polotsk Province of Pskov Governorate. In 1777, it was transferred to Polotsk Viceroyalty In 1796, the viceroyalty was abolished and the area was transferred to Belarus Governorate; since 1802 to Vitebsk Governorate. After 1919, Vitebsk Governorate was a part of the Russian Soviet Federative Socialist Republic. In 1924, Sebezhsky Uyezd was transferred to Pskov Governorate.

On August 1, 1927, the uyezds were abolished and Sebezhsky District was established, with the administrative center in the town of Sebezh. It included parts of former Sebezhsky Uyezd. The governorates were abolished as well and the district became a part of Velikiye Luki Okrug of Leningrad Oblast. On June 17, 1929, the district was transferred to Western Oblast. On July 23, 1930, the okrugs were also abolished, and the districts were directly subordinated to the oblast. On January 29, 1935, the district was transferred to Kalinin Oblast, and on February 5 of the same year, Sebezhsky District became a part of Velikiye Luki Okrug of Kalinin Oblast, one of the okrugs abutting the state boundaries of the Soviet Union. On May 4, 1938, the district was transferred to Opochka Okrug. On February 5, 1941, the okrug was abolished. Between 1941 and 1944, Sebezhsky District was occupied by German troops. On August 22, 1944, the district was transferred to newly established Velikiye Luki Oblast. On October 2, 1957, Velikiye Luki Oblast was abolished and Sebezhsky District was transferred to Pskov Oblast.

On August 1, 1927, Idritsky District with the administrative center in the settlement of Idritsa was also established. It included parts of former Sebezhsky Uyezd. The district was a part of Velikiye Luki Okrug of Leningrad Oblast. On June 17, 1929, the district was transferred to Western Oblast. On July 23, 1930, the okrugs were also abolished and the districts were directly subordinated to the oblast. On January 1, 1932, Idritsky District was abolished and split between Sebezhsky and Pustoshkinsky Districts. On June 1, 1936, it was re-established as a part of Velikiye Luki Okrug of Kalinin Oblast; on May 4, 1938, the district was transferred to Opochka Okrug. On August 22, 1944, the district was transferred to Velikiye Luki Oblast. On October 2, 1957, Velikiye Luki Oblast was abolished and Idritsky District was transferred to Pskov Oblast. On October 3, 1959, Idritsky District was abolished and merged into Sebezhsky District.

Restricted access
The part of the district along the state border with Latvia is included into a border security zone, intended to protect the borders of Russia from unwanted activity. In order to visit the zone, a permit issued by the local Federal Security Service department is required.

Economy

Industry
In the district, there are enterprises of electrotechnical (capacitor production), construction, timber, textile, and food industries.

Agriculture
The main specializations of agriculture in the district are cattle breeding with meat and milk production and the production of potatoes and vegetables.

Transportation
The M9 Highway which connects Moscow and Riga crosses the district from east to west, passing Sebezh. Another road connects Sebezh with Opochka and Polotsk. The whole stretch between Opochka and Polotsk has been a toll road since 2002. There are also local roads.

The railway connecting Moscow and Riga also crosses the district, with Sebezh being the main station within the district.

Culture and recreation

The district contains thirty cultural heritage monuments of federal significance and additionally ninety-four objects classified as cultural and historical heritage of local significance. The federally protected monuments are the Trinity Church (formerly a Catholic church) in the town of Sebezh, as well as twenty-nine archeological sites.

Sebezh hosts the Sebezh District Museum, founded in 1927 and displaying collections of local interest.

References

Notes

Sources

External links

Districts of Pskov Oblast
States and territories established in 1927